Eleven ships of the Royal Navy have borne the name HMS Unicorn, after the mythological creature, the unicorn:

  was a 36-gun ship captured from Scotland in 1544 and sold in 1555.
  was a 56-gun ship launched in 1634 and sold in 1687.
  (or Little Unicorn) was an 18-gun fire ship originally in Dutch service as the Eenhoorn. She was captured in 1665 and expended on 4 June 1666, on the fourth day of the Four Days' Battle.
  was a 6-gun purchased in 1666 and sunk as a blockship at Chatham on 11 June 1667, together with five other vessels, in a futile attempt to block the Dutch from advancing up the River Medway.
  was a 28-gun sixth rate launched in 1748 and broken up in 1771.
  was a 20-gun post ship launched in 1776. The French frigate  captured her on 4 October 1780 took her into service as La Licorne.  recaptured her in April 1781. The Royal Navy took her back into service as Unicorn Prize; she was broken up at Deptford in 1787.
  was a 36-gun fifth rate launched in 1782. She was renamed HMS Thalia in 1783 and was broken up in 1814.
  was a 32-gun fifth rate launched in 1794 and broken up in 1815.
  is a  frigate, launched in 1824 and converted to a powder hulk in 1860. She was a Royal Naval Reserve drill ship from 1873. She was renamed Unicorn II in 1939 and Cressy from 1941 until 1959. She was handed over to a preservation society in 1968 and is preserved in Dundee as a museum ship.
  was an aircraft maintenance carrier, launched in 1941 and broken up around 1960.
  was an  launched in 1992. She was sold to Canada in 2001, who renamed her HMCS Windsor.

Battle honours
 Armada 1588
 Cadiz 1596
 Porto Farina 1655
 Santa Cruz 1657
 Lowestoft 1665
 Orfordness 1666
 Sole Bay 1672
 Schooneveld 1673
 Texel 1673
 "Vestale" 1761
 "Tribune" 1796
 Basque Roads 1809
 Salerno 1943
 Okinawa 1945
 Korea 1950-53

See also
 , a Canadian Forces Naval Reserve division in Saskatoon, Saskatchewan
 , similarly named ships in the French Navy
 , a fictional ship of the French Royal Navy featured in The Adventures of Tintin.

Citations

References
 
 
 

Royal Navy ship names